The Heino Eller Tartu Music College is a music school in Tartu, Estonia, founded in 1919. It got its current name in 1971, after the Estonian composer and music teacher Heino Eller, who taught in the school from 1920 until 1940.

Tartu School of Composition 
Heino Eller's return to Tartu in 1920, to teach in the Tartu Music School, led to the development in the 1920s–1930s of the Tartu school of composition

In 1920s, the school has a name Tartu Higher Music School.

Those identified with the school included: 
 Composers 
 Heino Eller (originator)
 Eduard Tubin
 Eduard Oja 
 Olav Roots 
 Alfred Karindi
 Johannes Bleive
 Music theorists
 Karl Leichter
Faculty
Harald Laksberg

Gallery

References

External links
 Heino Eller Tartu Music College 

History of Tartu
Schools in Tartu
Music schools in Estonia
Estonian music